Pete Clifford (born April 3, 1984) is a former American football offensive tackle. He was signed by the Arizona Cardinals as an undrafted free agent in 2008. He played college football at Michigan State.

Clifford has also been a member of the Tennessee Titans, Hartford Colonials, and New York Jets.

Professional career

Arizona Cardinals
After going undrafted in the 2008 NFL Draft, Clifford was signed by the Arizona Cardinals as an undrafted free agent. He was released with an injury settlement on August 30 during final cuts after rehabbing for five weeks he attended a workout with the Tennessee Titans and re-aggravated his injury he sustained in training camp.  He then spent the rest of the season out of football.

Tennessee Titans
Clifford was signed to a future contract by the Tennessee Titans on January 7, 2009. In June 2009, he was placed on the Waived/Injured list.

Hartford Colonials
Clifford was signed by the Hartford Colonials of the United Football League on August 26, 2010.

New York Jets
Clifford was signed by the New York Jets on August 5, 2011. He was waived on September 2.

References

External links
Michigan State Spartans bio
Tennessee Titans bio
Just Sports Stats

1984 births
Living people
American football offensive tackles
Michigan State Spartans football players
Arizona Cardinals players
Tennessee Titans players
Hartford Colonials players
New York Jets players